The Chamber is a 1996 American legal thriller film directed by James Foley. It is based on John Grisham's 1994 novel of the same name. The film stars Chris O'Donnell, Gene Hackman, Faye Dunaway, Lela Rochon, Robert Prosky, Raymond J. Barry, and David Marshall Grant.

Plot
In April 1967, the office of Marvin Kramer, a Jewish civil rights lawyer in Indianola, Mississippi, is bombed by the Ku Klux Klan, killing Kramer's five-year-old twin sons and leading to the amputation of Kramer's legs and his later suicide. Klansman Sam Cayhall is tried for murder in the bombing, and is eventually convicted and sentenced to die in the gas chamber at the Mississippi State Penitentiary.

Twenty-nine years later, Adam Hall, a young attorney at the Chicago law firm of Kravitz and Bane, seeks assignment to the firm's pro bono representation of Cayhall in the last weeks before his scheduled execution. Adam is Cayhall's grandson, his family having since moved away from the South and changed their name, haunted and shamed by Cayhall's actions. Adam is motivated to take the case in a search for some understanding of the dark secrets of his family, which prompted the suicide of Adam's father the year Sam was sentenced to death and whose body Adam found as a child.

Adam is sent by the firm to Jackson, Mississippi to take over the case and there reconnects with his aunt Lee Bowen, an alcoholic socialite who has managed to avoid public association with her infamous father, and who warns Adam about the dangers of dredging up the past. On death row, Sam remains a brusque, bitter, unrepentant racist who brags about his participation in the Klan bombing campaign of which the Kramer bombing was a part, though he denies that any of the bombings were intended to kill. He taunts Adam for his youth, legal inexperience, anti-racism, and the suicide of his father, but he agrees to allow Adam to represent him, though he forbids Adam from seeking clemency from Mississippi Governor McAllister, who had prosecuted Sam in his last retrial and had campaigned on that prosecution in his election to Governor. Nevertheless, as he begins to argue the case, Adam is approached by the Governor through an aide, Nora Stark, who suggests that he might consider clemency if Sam provides information about unidentified co-conspirators to the bombing.

As Adam investigates, inconsistencies in the facts of the original case come to light, casting doubt on Sam's intent to kill and suggesting that he lacked the ability to make the bomb himself, and both Stark and the original FBI agent who investigated the case indicate that the bombing may have been the result of a broader conspiracy involving the Mississippi State Sovereignty Commission and White Citizens' Councils, which were active at the time of the bombing in opposition to civil rights.

Sam refuses to authorize Adam to seek access to the Sovereignty Commission's files, sealed by order of the state legislature, fearing it would expose Sam's former associates in the Klan, as well allowing the Governor to obtain useful information on political enemies, which he indicates is the Governor's real reason for seeking Sam's cooperation in unsealing the files.

Adam continues to work through the courts, filing and arguing motions for a stay of execution, including on the grounds that Sam was legally insane and unable to tell right from wrong, due to his indoctrination into the Ku Klux Klan. At the same time, Lee, faced with the unearthed ghosts of the family history and having lapsed back into full-blown alcoholism, reveals to Adam that in the early 1950s, as children, she and Adam's father had witnessed their father murder the family's African-American neighbor Joe Lincoln during a fight that had started because Adam's father, Eddie, had wrongly accused Lincoln's son of stealing a toy soldier. Eddie had blamed himself for the murder, as well as Lee, for failing to stop Sam, the guilt of which was a factor in Eddie's later suicide and Lee's alcoholism. Lee also reveals how their father had been indoctrinated into the Klan as a child, showing Adam a historic photograph of Sam as a young boy attending a Klan lynching which Adam uses in his arguments before the courts.

Adam and Nora secretly gain access to the Sovereignty Commission's sealed files, which prove a wider conspiracy to the bombing, and also indicate the participation of an accomplice.  The former FBI agent resurfaces, and reveals to Adam that the FBI had identified the accomplice, Rollie Wedge, whom the FBI had never been able to prove responsible, but who has reunited with other Klan members to commemorate the bombing on the eve of the pending execution.

Adam goes to a Klan reunion but is beaten by several members and threatened at gunpoint by Wedge. Adam's persistence, the revelation of how much Sam's hatred had destroyed his family, and his impending execution begin to affect Sam, and he softens, reconciling with Lee and expressing remorse for his actions and the effect they have had on his family. Sam forcefully rejects the Klan when Wedge visits him in prison to encourage him to remain silent, and it is revealed that Wedge was the one who had built the bomb and set it deliberately to detonate.

Ultimately, Adam's motions for a stay are denied by the courts, including the United States Supreme Court. Despite Sam's finally authorizing the release of relevant Sovereignty Commission files, the Governor refuses to grant clemency, betraying him and Adam, while nonetheless using the files as political leverage as Sam had predicted. Wedge, identified in the files, is finally arrested.

Ultimately, Sam is executed in the gas chamber, though Adam remains a confidant and advocate for his grandfather up until his execution, and he and Lee embrace at the end, in the hope that maybe the ghosts of the past are gone.

Cast
 Chris O'Donnell as Adam Hall 
 Gene Hackman as Sam Cayhall 
 Faye Dunaway as Lee Cayhall Bowen 
 Robert Prosky as E. Garner Goodman 
 Raymond J. Barry as Rollie Wedge
 Bo Jackson as Sgt. Clyde Packer 
 Lela Rochon as Nora Stark 
 David Marshall Grant as Governor David McAllister 
 Nicholas Pryor as Judge Flynn F. Slattery 
 Harve Presnell as Attorney General Roxburgh
 Millie Perkins as Ruth Kramer

Production history
Universal bought the film rights for $4 million. Ron Howard was originally set to direct the film for Universal. In May 1994 it was reported William Goldman was paid $1 million to write the script.

Howard left the project in May 1995 because of what he described as "a hunch". He stayed on as a producer though. "It's a strong story, and William Goldman is doing great work on the screenplay."

Brad Pitt was committed to playing Adam Hall, but left the project when Howard left to direct Ransom.

William Goldman described the project as a "total wipeout disaster... a terrible experience" and never saw the finished movie.

Filming locations
Scenes were filmed in a photo realistic recreation of the gas chamber on studio sets in Los Angeles. Other locations were filmed in Chicago, Jackson, Mississippi, Indianola, Mississippi, Greenwood, Mississippi, Parchman, Mississippi, and Cleveland, Mississippi.

Reception
Critical reaction to The Chamber has been negative. On Rotten Tomatoes the film has an approval rating of 15% based on reviews from 26 critics. On Metacritic the film has a score of 45 out of 100 based on reviews from 18 critics. Audiences surveyed by CinemaScore gave the film a grade "B+" on scale of A to F.

Roger Ebert gave the film two stars out of four, remarking: "In the early days of X-rated movies, they were always careful to include something of 'redeeming social significance' to justify their erotic content. Watching The Chamber, I was reminded of that time. The attitudes about African Americans and Jews here represent the pornography of hate, and although the movie ends by punishing evil, I got the sinking feeling that, just as with the old sex films, by the time the ending came around, some members of the audience had already gotten what they bought their tickets for." James Berardinelli also gave the film two stars out of four, saying: "Plot-wise, The Chamber is full of seeming irrelevancies. The movie should have been streamlined better; there's no need to try to include virtually every character from the book. [...] The Chamber [...] is mechanical and artificial, and tells you what to think."

Grisham called the film a "disaster" and a "train wreck from the beginning". He added, "It could not have been handled worse by those involved, including me. I made a fundamental error when I sold the film rights before I finished writing the book. It was a dreadful movie. Gene Hackman was the only good thing in it." Faye Dunaway's performance in the movie earned her a Razzie Award nomination for Worst Supporting Actress, but she did not win the award.

See also

 Civil rights movement in popular culture
 Civil Rights Movement

References

External links
 
 
 
 

1996 films
1996 thriller films
1990s American films
1990s English-language films
1990s legal films
American legal films
American thriller films
Films about capital punishment
Films about the Ku Klux Klan
Davis Entertainment films
Films based on American thriller novels
Films based on works by John Grisham
Films directed by James Foley
Films produced by John Davis
Films produced by Brian Grazer
Films scored by Carter Burwell
Films set in Mississippi
Films shot in Mississippi
Films with screenplays by William Goldman
Imagine Entertainment films
Universal Pictures films